Tibati (Fula: Tibati 𞤼𞤭𞤦𞤢𞤼𞤭) is a town and commune in Djérem, Cameroon. The town and region are reigned by a local monarch, the Lamido. 
The most notable economic activity in the region is the fishery industry. The fish comes from the lake Mbakaou, a large dammed lake next to Tibati. It is distributed all over Cameroon, mainly to the capital Yaoundé.
The town's medical needs are covered by a large missionary hospital in Ngaoubela, approximately 15 km in the north, following N15 / N6 into the direction of Ngaoundal. This hospital is led by an Austrian physicist and supported by several donor organisations in Vorarlberg, Austria and the United States. An exchange of volunteers from Europe and North America is taking place on a regular basis.

See also
Communes of Cameroon

References
 ENTWICKLUNGSPARTNERSCHAFT FÜR KAMERUN - the Austrian donor organisation
Blog article on the Lamido of Tibati
 Site de la primature - Élections municipales 2002 
 Contrôle de gestion et performance des services publics communaux des villes camerounaises - Thèse de Donation Avele, Université Montesquieu Bordeaux IV 
 Charles Nanga, La réforme de l’administration territoriale au Cameroun à la lumière de la loi constitutionnelle n° 96/06 du 18 janvier 1996, Mémoire ENA. 

Communes of Cameroon
Populated places in Adamawa Region